Carlos Conca (born November 3, 1954) is a Chilean applied mathematician, engineer and scientist. He is the first Chilean scientist to be recognized by the French government with a distinction in the field of Exact and Natural Sciences.

He was awarded with the Premio Nacional de Ciencias Exactas de Chile in 2004.

Biography

Studies
Carlos Conca was born in the capital Santiago de Chile (Chile) on November 3, 1954. His primary and secondary education was undertaken at the Colegio Saint Gabriel’s English School where he majored in mathematics,

He attended the Facultad de Ciencias Físicas y Matemáticas de la Universidad de Chile at the University of Chile in 1973 obtaining the Ingeniero Civil Matemático in February 1977.

That same year in 1978, he entered the Department of Mathematical Engineering of the Faculty as an assistant.

In France
On October 6, 1978 he travelled to Paris, France, to seek a doctorate in Applied Mathematics. In Paris in the February 1981, he was contracted by the ' Centre National of the Recherche Scientifique (CNRS) of France, in a permanent position at the Laboratory of Numerical Analysis of the University of Paris. His work was published in the magazine Numerische Mathematik (Springer-Verlag), recognizing him internationally in his field.

At the University of Paris in July 1985 his thesis entitled: ' ' Homogenization of the Equations of the Mechanics of Fluids, granted him the degree of ' ' Docteur d'Etat is Sciences Mathématiques. This work was published in the' ' Journal de Mathématiques Pures et the Appliqueés' ' (Gauthier-Villars/Elsevier), oldest of the specialized magazines in France, founded in 1836 by Joseph Liouville.

Return to Chile
On 12 November 1987 he returned to Chile, where he began work on the National Project of Applied Mathematics at the University of Chile. In 1988 he was named Director of the Computer center of the University of Chile and the following year was chosen Director of the Department of Mathematical Civil Engineering, a position that he occupied until mid to late 1991. In this role he contributed decisively to the modernization of the education at the School of Engineering and created the Programs of Doctorate and Magíster in Applied Mathematics at the University.

In 1996, he opened a new chapter with the creation and beginning of Program FONDAP of Applied Mathematics. In May 2000, Conca and the Center for Mathematical Modeling (CMM), opened up new branches of investigation in diverse applied areas of his field of study including mean-atmosphere, inverse problems in climatology and oceanography, numerical simulation in fusion and copper conversion, mathematical models in physiology, etc. During 2001 this led to the creation of the Program of Doctorate in Hydrodynamics of the University of Chile.

Between the period 1997-2002 Conca was a Titular Member of the Commission of Academic Evaluation of the Faculty of Physical and Mathematical Sciences of the University of Chile; and was president from 2001 to 2003.

Seminars and conferences
Conca has been invited to give classes and lectures at many prestigious schools internationally including Spain, Ecuador, France, Brazil and in other cities throughout his native Chile. He has been invited to dictate Plenary and Inaugural Conferences at various International Congresses of Mathematics such as at the  Italian-Latinoamerican Conference on Applied and Mathematics in Rome in 1998, at the 26th French National Congress on Numerical Analysis, at Ardèche later that year, the 4th World Congress on Computational Mechanics, Buenos Aires (1998), the 1st International Congress on Asymptotic Analysis of Average Heterogeneous Structures, St. Petersburg (2001), the 1st Latin America Congress of Mathematicians, in Rio de Janeiro (2000), the XVII ' National Spanish Congress on Differential Equations and Applications and VII Congress on Applied Mathematics, Salamanca, Spain (2001), and the 6th France-Chile and Latinoamerican Conference on Applied Mathematics, at Santiago (2002). He has also lectures in many universities, institutes and research centers in countries as wide ranging as Chile, Argentina, France, Spain, Russia, India, Romania, United States, Portugal, Italy, Belgium.

Conca served as chairman and organizer of the 2nd Congress of Franco-Chilean and Latin American Applied Mathematics, in Santiago in December 1988.

From 2002, he is the only Latin American mathematician named Member of the Publishing Committee of the noted scientific journal  "Mathematical Models and Methods in Applied Sciences", World Scientific Publishing Co Ltd., New York/London.

Awards
Carlos Conca was awarded the Manuel Noriega Moral prize in 1994, in the field of Exact Sciences. One is a recognition of Latin American character, granted by the Organization of American States. In 1996 he was awarded the prize Manuel Montt'', in the field of Exact Sciences, a distinction that was shared with Chilean biophysicist Dr Oscar González-Ferrán. The President of the Republic granted to him in 1996 a Presidential Chair in Sciences, which he was elected by a jury of international professors R. Marcus (Pasadena; President, Nobel prize de Qui'mica, 1991), D. Gross (Princeton), C. Milstein (Cambridge, U.K.), And Neher (Göttingen), P. Cartier (Paris). That same year in 1994 he received from the hands of the Director of the University of Chile, the Rectoral Medal.

In France, by disposition of the Minister of Education, Investigation and Technology, on July 15, 1998, it was confirmed that a decision had been made by the University Councils of the University of Metz to confer the title Doctor Honoris Cause on him. The ceremony took place on November 26, 1998 in the François-Yves amphitheatre Him Moigne, of the Saulcy Campus of the University of Metz.

As a result, Carlos Concabecame the first Chilean scientist in being recognized by the French Government with a distinction of this type in the area of Exact and Natural Sciences.

Publications
Books published include:
Problèmes Mathèmatiques en Couplage Fluide-Structure, Eyrolles, Paris, 1993.
Fluids and Periodic Structures, Masson, Paris, 1993; J.~Wiley, New York, 1995.
Boundary layers in the homogenization of a spectral problem in fluid-solid structures, SIAM, J. Math. Anal. 1998, con G. Allaire.
Bloch wave homogenization and spectral asymptotic analysis, J. Math. Pures et Appl.  1998, with G. Allaire.
Bloch wave decomposition in the homogenization of periodically perforated media, Indiana Univ. Math. J. 1998, with D. Gómez, M. Lobo-Hidalgo, M.-E. Pérez.

External links
Carlos Conca en la Universidad de Chile
Reuna:Carlos Conca

1954 births
Living people
Chilean engineers
20th-century Chilean mathematicians
21st-century Chilean mathematicians
People from Santiago
University of Chile alumni